Chaucer School is a secondary school with academy status located in the Parson Cross area of Sheffield, South Yorkshire, England. Named after Geoffrey Chaucer, the school became Sheffield's third comprehensive school (after Myers Grove School and Hinde House School) in 1964, located on two sites separated by a field, one newly built. These were made up of the west building (Top) located on Halifax Road and the east building (Bottom) on Wordsworth Avenue.

By 2005, these buildings were old and in need of refurbishment, and all of the staff, students and resources were moved into the "bottom" building which underwent internal and external improvement including the erection of a new sports hall and drama and music rooms.

The new school re-opened in September 2006 as Chaucer Business And Enterprise College, one of only 17 English schools formally authorized to adopt Building Schools for the Future (BSF) status. The specialist school, now with over 1000 pupils in the 11 to 16 age-group had undergone a £15 million transformation to upgrade services and infrastructure.

Chaucer is part of the Tapton School Academy Trust.

References

External links
Official website
First Building Schools for the Future (BSF) Pathfinder Contract with Chaucer School in Sheffield
British Government CVA evaluation for Chaucer (2005)

Educational institutions established in 1964
Secondary schools in Sheffield
Geoffrey Chaucer
1964 establishments in England
Academies in Sheffield